The Grimoire is a supplement published by FASA in 1990 for the near-future science fiction role-playing game Shadowrun. A second edition was published in 1994.

Contents
The Grimoire is a supplement that contains rules for magical societies, magic spells, Astral Space, and spirits.

Publication history
The Grimoire was written by Paul R. Hume, with a cover by John Zeleznik, and published by FASA Corp. in 1990 as a 128-page book.

Reception
In the November 1992 edition of Dragon (Issue #187), Allen Varney wrote, "The book amazes me. On every page, you find new ideas, always presented with a shrewd sense of playability in the campaign." While he complimented the wide range of material, saying "all of these should provoke ideas for mage PCs and GMs alike", he also noted that the new material's "learning curve strikes me as steep, their upper reaches open mainly to power gamers who study the subject as closely as real mages would." Nonetheless, Varney concluded that "Few works treat game magic with such authenticity, such awareness of the roles magic has played in society from ancient times to the present — and the future."

Other reviews
White Wolf #23 (Oct./Nov., 1990)
Revistas Dragon Magazine

References

Role-playing game supplements introduced in 1990
Shadowrun supplements